The Florence School is located at 7902 North 36th Street in the Florence neighborhood of north Omaha, Nebraska, United States. The first school in the Florence area was built in the 1840s, in what was then called Cutler's Park by Mormon pioneers. The present-day Florence Elementary School was started in the late 1850s after the town of Florence was founded.

About
As early as 1868 the Florence School was used as a polling place in Nebraska state elections. 

A new building was erected in 1889 at the base of the bluff overlooking the Missouri River. 

In the 1890s, Julia Krisl became one of the first Czech principals in the city of Omaha while at the Florence School. The Florence School building was replaced in 1964. 

Florence B. Reynolds, a principal at the school in the 1920s, was a published scholar who examined labor relations with teachers.

References

External links
 Florence Elementary School

Elementary schools in Omaha, Nebraska
Schools in North Omaha, Nebraska
Public elementary schools in Nebraska